The Wife from the Dragon Palace is a Japanese folktale collected by scholar Yanagita Kunio. Other scholars locate similar stories in Central and East Asia.

Summary
Yanagita collected a variant from Kikaijima, Kagoshima. In this version, a woman lives with her only surviving son. He earns his living by gathering and selling flowers. One day, when he has not earned much, he throws a bunch of them into the sea as an offering to the Dragon God. A tortoise appears to him and leads him to the Dragon God's underwater palace. The tortoise also advises that, if the Dragon God offers him a gift, ask for his daughter. The boy spends three days in the underwater palace and returns to land with the Dragon King's daughter as his wife. When he goes back home, he learns that three years have passed and that his mother has passed away. Fortunately for him, his wife takes out a Life Whip and uses it on her mother-in-law to revive her. She also uses a magic mallet to create a larger house for them.

Some time later, a local feudal lord finds out about the flower-seller's beautiful wife and decides to have her for himself. First, he demands the flower-seller bring him 100 koku of rice. The boy returns home and tells his wife about the task. The Dragon God's daughter goes to the seashore and summons hundreds of horses that come out of the sea with the rice. Next, the feudal lord demands 1000 fathoms of rope to be delivered to him. Once again, the Dragon God's daughter produces the requested item after going to the sea shore. Thirdly, he announces he will visit the flower-seller's house with 699 men and demands his guests be fed and given 77 jars of foaming wine. The flower-seller's wife prepares the large banquet with trays of food and wine. Finally, the lord asks the girl to give them some rowdy entertainment. The Dragon God's daughter opens up a box; hundreds of men come out and perform a song and dance for the guests. The lord then asks for some quiet entertainment, and she opens another box: hundreds of men leap out of it with swords and kill the lord and his guests.

Analysis

Tale type
The tale is classified in the international Aarne-Thompson-Uther Index as type ATU 465, "The Man persecuted because of his beautiful wife": a man of poor social standing marries or is given a beautiful wife of supernatural origin; some time later, an emperor, lord or nobleman of superior rank lusts after the wife of supernatural origin and sends the mortal husband on impossible quests.

Japanese folklorist Seki Keigo indexed in his own system of Japanese folktales a tale type he termed The Wife from the Ryūgū (Dragon Palace). In this type, a poor flower-dealer gives an offering to the king of the Ryugu (Dragon Palace). A messenger from the underwater palace comes and takes the flower-dealer to the king's presence. The king is pleased by the man's offering, gives him a gift and allows him to marry his daughter. Back on land, a local feudal lord imposes difficult tasks on the man, otherwise he must forfeit his wife, the underwater king's daughter.

Variants

Literary predecessors
The oldest attestation of the tale type is found in ancient East Asian literature of the 7th century, namely Chinese and Japanese.

Japan
Yanagita located variants from across Japan in the following regions: Iwate; Niigata; Gifu, Yoshiki-gun; Shimane, Ochi-gun; Nagasaki, Kagoshima, Kikaijima; and in Koshikijima. Keigo located variants from Ehime, Hiroshima, Iwate, Kagoshima, Kochi, Nagasaki, Niigata, and Shimane.

China
Chinese folklorist and scholar  established a second typological classification of Chinese folktales (the first was by Wolfram Eberhard in the 1930s). In his new system, he noted that Chinese variants of type 465, "The Man Persecuted Because of his Beautiful Wife", may be preceded with another tale type he dubbed 555*, "The Grateful Dragon Prince (Princess)". In the latter type, the hero rescues an animal (fish, turtle, serpent) or gives offering to a water deity. The animal reveals he is a Dragon Prince and takes the hero to his father's underwater court. Down there, the hero is given a box with a bird inside (a pheasant, a hen) and takes it with him back to land. The animal leaves the box and becomes a woman; the man sees her and she tells him she is a daughter of the Dragon King (a Dragon Princess). They marry and the tale segues into type 465.

Lowell Edmunds, in his book Stealing Helen, provided a Chinese variant titled Long nüe ("Dragon Girl"): an elder brother tries to get rid of his younger brother by locking him in a trunk and casting him downstream. The youth begins to play on his bamboo flute, which draws the attention of the aquatic Dragon King. The deity sends two dispatches to get the human to his underwater palace, where he spends some time. Before he departs, the dispatches advise the human to ask for the Dragon King's pup as reward, since the little animal is the daughter of a goddess. The youth takes the pup with him to the human world and it becomes a beautiful maiden and they marry. Some time into their marriage, a servant of the emperor sights the maiden and reports back to the emperor. The emperor first tasks the humble flute player with providing an army in three days time. His supernatural wife helps him and creates the army for the emperor. The emperor then sends guards to take the maiden by force, but the humble man tricks the emperor and gains her back.

Central Asia
Folklorist  stated that the tale type was very popular in Central Asia. In these variants, the hero saves the child of a supernatural entity (e.g., the king of snakes, the king of the underworld, the king of Heaven, Khurbust Khan), and in gratitude their father gives the hero a box or an animal as companion. Either the box contains the supernatural wife, or the animal becomes the supernatural wife. Either way, marital life is not an idyllic one, for they have to fend off the advances of a human lord, who wishes to have the supernatural woman to himself.

Mongolia
German linguist  translated a Mongolian tale from the Siddi Kur wherein an Indian king's animal tamer releases a dancing golden frog back to the water and later rescues a white serpent from the clutches of an eagle. The golden frog and the white serpent each tell the tamer they are the children of the Lord of Dragons that guards the shells with white pearls. The tamer is taken to their father's underwater palace as a thank you and spends some time there. After a while, the tamer wants to return to land, and as a parting gift the Dragon Lord gives the man a red-furred she-dog as companion and a magical jewel. Back on land, the tamer discovers the red-furred she-dog becomes a beautiful woman and burns the canine skin. They marry. One day, the Dragon Lord's daughter, now human, is kidnapped by a lustful human king who intends to marry her. However, she secretly summons her human husband to concoct a plan to be enacted the following year, during the month of Pausha: the husband disguises himself with a crude and grotesque design and take part in the celebrations. British author Rachel Harriette Busk translated the tale as different chapters of her book Sagas from the Far East: in the first, titled The White Serpent-King, the gold frog states the she is the daughter of the Serpent King (who still lives in an underwater palace); in the second, titled What became of the Red-coloured Dog, the tamer burns the red dog's skin to keep the woman in human form.

Russian ethnographer Grigory Potanin collected an Ordos Mongolian tale from a teller in Uxin. In this tale, titled "Шацгай ханъ (царь-сорока)" ("Magpie Tsar"), a boy leaves home to learn a trade, and he goes back after he learns to play the khur (a musical instrument). His father is disappointed and banishes him from home. The boy wanders off to the edge of a lake and plays the khur until he dozes off. When he wakes up, a man appears to him and invites him to play at the wedding of Chagan Losun Khan's daughter, at the bottom of the lake. The boy accompanies the man to the underwater world and plays at the wedding for seven days. The man advises him to ask as payment for the yellow dog and a door latch. The boy gets the dog and the latch and goes back to the human world. He finds a seemingly empty large yurt and lives with the yellow dog as his companion. When he sleeps, the yellow dog takes off the dogskin, becomes a human maiden and prepares the food. The khur player awakes, sees the dogskin and burns it. The maiden admonishes that he was too hasty. Men from Shatsgai khan's retinue come to the boy's yurt and cook some meat in their bonfire, but let it be overcooked when they see the khur player's wife. Sensing their fear, the wife cooks for them new pieces of meat that they bring to Shatsgai khan. The khan is delighted at the tasty meat and notices it is not the one they brought from the hunt. The servants tell the khan about the beautful maiden in the yurt. The khan goes to meeat the maiden and her husband and proposes a game: both the khan and the boy shall hide, and one shall find the other; whoever wins gets the throne. The khur player wins by hiding with his wife's help and finding the khan. Still not wanting to admit defeat, the khan sets a new test: let their horses run wild; whichever returns first shall be declared the victor. The khur player is advised by his wife to go to the edge of the lake and ask his father-in-law for an eight-legged horse and a four-legged lion. Then, the khan orders the khur player to boil water in a tokum. The boy also traverses a lake twice, but the khan fails.

Kalmyk people
A very similar story is attested in the Kalmyk Folktale Corpus, as summarized by philologist researcher Irina S. Nadbitova, who classified it as type 449, "Царевна-собака" ("The Dog-Princess"). In this narrative, the humble hero saves the son of the Dragon King, who grants him a little she-dog; the man returns to land and the she-dog becomes a lovely maiden who marries him, but the khan lusts after her.

Tibet
In a Tibetan tale translated into Russian with the title "Девушка-дракон" ("The Dragon Girl"), a father dies and his three sons, named First Brother, Second Brother and Third Brother divide their inheritance: a golden box, a silver box and a wooden box. Third Brother takes the wooden box and goes to live a humble life. One day, he rescues a little snake from an eagle and places the animal under his hat. He then walks a bit more and hears two yaks talking about their son. Third Brother goes on a bit more and finds two other yaks commenting about their grandchild. The youth shows them the little snake, who they recognize as their grandchild. The yaks invite the human to their underwater palace. The next day, Third Brother goes to the lake and is taken to the underwater palace. He spends some time there, and meets the grandmother (one of the yaks), who advises him to asks three gifts from the Dragon King: a bull's tail, a woolen carpet and the Dragon King's little spotted dog. Third Brother follows the instructions and rejects the extravagant gifts of jewels and weapons. He takes the three objects with him to his humble house and sleeps. The next day, the woolen carpet changes his house and the bull's tail generates herds of sheep and cows for him. As for the dog, it does a somersault and becomes a human maiden. Third Brother spies on her becoming human and burns the dog skin. The maiden tells him she is the youngest daughter of the Dragon King and that she has come to live with him, and that the dog skin was for her protection. Resigned to her fate, the Dragon King's daughter and Third Brother live as husband and wife. However, a local king learns of the humble man and his beautiful wife and decides to have her for himself, so he devises three difficult tasks for Third Brother; if he fails, he shall forfeit his possessions and wife to him. The Dragon King's daughter helps her human husband. In an abridged form of the tale, translated into Russian by Tibetologist  with the title "Бедняк и дочь дракона" ("The Poor Man and the Dragon's Daughter"), the poor man rescues the snake and returns the animal to two knights, one on a white horse, and another on a black horse - both emissaries of the marine Dragon King. In the English language translation, titled The Poor Man and the Serpent's Daughter, the supernatural wife is described as the daughter of the Serpent King (who is still identified as a marine deity).

In a Tibetan tale published by A. L. Shelton with the title The Story of the Violinist, a father sends his three sons into the world to learn a trade and return home. The oldest becomes a writer, the second one a carpenter and the youngest a violinist. The father expels his youngest son from home, and he travels to another kingdom near a black sea. One day, the violinist sees a black snake and a white snake fighting, and he saves the white snake. Some time later, a white-haired woman appears to thank the youth for saving the son of the king of the lower regions, the white snake, and invites him to go with her to his palace. She also explains that his daughter is very beautiful, but hides her face underneath a chicken skin. The fiddler is taken by the woman to the king's palace and asks for the hen as his reward. The daughter of the king of the lower regions agrees to go with the human, and takes with her a golden pick, a golden chain, and a brass blessing cup. They return to land and live as husband and wife, and become very rich. The local monarch, a wicked man, is invited by the fiddler to his house for a banquet, and he notices the fiddler's wife. He takes her with him and orders the fiddler to level a mountain, to turn a small pond into a forested lake, and to show him hell. The fiddler accomplishes the outlandish tasks with his wife's help and items she brought with herself to the surface.

Russian ethnographer Grigory Potanin collected a "Tangut" (19th century designation for Tibetan people) tale he titled "Дочь Водянаго Царя" ("Daughter of the Water King"): a youth hits a whirlwind that burrows underground and goes to tell the king. The king sends some men with the youth and they rescue a princess from underground, but the king's men abandon the youth in the hole. He finds a dragon in hole that asks the human to stay with it until it regains its health. Fully recovered, the dragon takes the youth to the court of the Water King, since the dragon is his daughter, and advises him to ask for a piece of wood and a black donkey. The Water King welcomes the human youth and asks him to choose his reward for protecting his daughter. The youth chooses the piece of the wood and the donkey, then returns home. He plants the wood outside his house and goes to sleep. A woman comes out of the wood, cleans the place and prepares the food, then goes back to the wood. The youth learns of this and burns the wood to strand the woman in the mortal realm, and marries her. Some time later, he decides to invite the human king to his house, despite his wife's warnings. The human king visits the youth and becomes enamoured with the youth's wife. The human king then plans to get rid of the youth and take his wife for himself, by ordering some tasks: to build a bridge between the royal palace and the youth's house; then, to plant trees along it, and to roll out a carpet between both houss. Seeing that the youth accomplished all tasks - with his wife's magical help -, the king decides to make a deadlier contest between him and the youth: to see whose dog is stronger, then who is capable of digging out a mountain, and finally, whose army is stronger.

Bhutan
Author Kunzang Choden published a Bhutanese tale titled The Shepherd: a poor shepherd grazes his sheep near a lake. He then sees a white rat and a black rat fighting, the black rat clearly superior. The shepherd intervenes and protects the white rat. Some time later, two women come out of the lake and introduce themselves as emissaries of the subterranean king; the white rat was his son. As thanks, the subterranean king invites the man to his court. The shepherd goes to the underground world and is advised to choose as a reward a simple looking dog. The subterranean king is reluctant at first to part with the dog, but concedes and lets the shepherd have it. The youth goes home with the dog. Back home to the "middle world", the shepherd keeps the dog at home and grazes the sheep. He goes back home and the place is clean and the meal prepared. The shepherd discovers the dog takes off its skin and becomes a human maiden. While she is away at the lake making an oblation to her father, Tsuena Rinchen, the king of the subterranean world, the shepherd burns the dogskin. He marries the now human daughter of the subterranean king. Some time later, a king from the human world sees the shepherd's wife and becomes enamoured of her, and decides to send the youth on impossible demands: to raze a whole forest in a mountain, to create a wheat field and harvest the grain. With his wife's family's help, the shepherd prevails.

Chung people
In a tale from the Chung people titled The Third Son and the Magistrate, three sons, after their father dies, each learn a trade. The youngest brother becomes a fisherman and catches a carp alongside other fishes, and takes care of it. A man appears some time later, reveals the carp was him, a son of the Dragon King, and takes the fisherman to his father's underwater court. The human gains a white chicken, which is the disguise of a daughter of the Dragon King. The Dragon King's daughter reveals herself and marries the human. A local magistrate sees the human form of the Dragon King's daughter - now on land with her husband - and wishes to possess her, so he sets impossible tasks for the humble fisherman. The man accomplishes every task with the help of his wife and her underwater family.

Shor people
In a tale from the Shor people, titled "ЧАГЫС - ОДИНОКИЙ ПАРЕНЬ" ("Chagys, the Lonely Fellow"), a poor man trades his sheep for a pike caught by fishermen and releases the fish back to the sea. Some time later, an emissary of the хозяин (master) of the waters demands his presence in the underwater court. Down there, the man learns the pike is the son of the master of the water and asks as reward a little red-furred dog. Chagys returns to land with the little dog. For two days, he sleeps and wakes up to see that his house is clean and the food prepared. On the third day, he discovers a copper-haired girl in his house (the human form of the little dog). He touches her and she is taken aback, saying that the son of the master of the water will come for them. The creature comes, as predicted, and offers to play a game of hide and seek with Chagys - whoever wins, gets the copper-haired girl (tale type ATU 329, "Hiding from the Devil (Princess)"). The son of the master of the water hides first: first, as a ram with twisted horns; then, as a bull, and later as a crested bird. With the girl's help, Chagys locates him every time. When it is his turn, the girl turns Chagys first into a comb, then as a thimble, and finally into a needle. The son of the master of the water cannot find him, and Chagys wins. As a last resort, the master of the water orders Chagys to search for a golden table in "such and such a place". The copper-haired girl gives the man some provisions for the road and advises him to cast a ball of yarn and follow it wherever it stops. Chagys follows the ball of yarn and reaches the houses of the girl's three sisters, each older than the last. He learns from the eldest sister where to get the golden table. Chagys rides a six-legged horse to a mountain top, steals the table from a shaman and rides back to the eldest sister. On the journey back, he declares he wants some food and dishes appear on the table. Chagys proclaims he wishes to eat with a companion and the invisible spirit of the golden table eats with him. The man returns home with the table and the son of the master of the water concedes defeat.

See also
 Toyotama-hime
 Urashima Taro
 Go I Know Not Whither and Fetch I Know Not What

References 

Japanese fairy tales
Asian fairy tales
Male characters in fairy tales
Female characters in fairy tales
ATU 460-499